Jo Geon-haeng (born 7 February 1965) is a South Korean former cyclist. He competed in the team time trial event at the 1984 Summer Olympics.

References

External links
 

1965 births
Living people
South Korean male cyclists
Olympic cyclists of South Korea
Cyclists at the 1984 Summer Olympics
Place of birth missing (living people)